Puhoi is a village in Ialoveni District, Moldova. Puhoi is home to the Asconi winery, where most of the village's residents are employed. American news magazine Time has described alcohol as "the lifeblood of the economy and the community".

References

Villages of Ialoveni District
Populated places established in the 1460s